Ferdinand Alexander "Ferry" Sonneville (3 January 1931 – 20 November 2003) was an Indonesian badminton player noted for his touch, consistency, tactical astuteness, and coolness under pressure. He won numerous international singles titles from the mid-1950s through the early 1960s and his clutch performances helped Indonesia to win its first three Thomas Cup (men's world team) titles consecutively in  1958, 1961, and 1964, setting the pattern for his country's continued formidable presence in world badminton. Sonneville's playing career ended on a sour note in the 1967 Thomas Cup final in Jakarta when, past his prime, he was roundly booed by his countrymen after dropping singles matches in Indonesia's controversial loss to Malaysia.

After his high-level playing days ended Sonneville was elected to terms as both president of the International Badminton Federation (now World Badminton Federation) and president of the Badminton Association of Indonesia (PBSI).

Private life 
Sonneville inherited his sports talents from his parents. His father was Dirk Jan Sonneville (1906-1944), a local tennis champion in the 1930s, and Leonij Elisabeth de Vogel (later Hubeek) (1908-1989), a badminton champion between 1935 and 1945, who taught him the game in the 1940s. His father was a brigade major of the Royal Netherlands East Indies Army in the war and was executed by the Japanese.
Sonneville married Yvonne Theresia de Wit in September 1954 and had 3 children, called Ferdinand Rudy Jr. (who died at the age of 21), Genia Theresia, and Cynthia Guedolyn. Sonneville also had two grandchildren.
His religion was Catholic.

Education 
 Erasmus University, Netherlands

Sports career 
 Jiujitsu Athlete and coach (1949–1955)
 Playing captain or coach when Indonesia won or successfully defended Thomas Cup (world team badminton championships) 3 times in succession (1958, 1961, and 1964).
 Winning Malaysia Open (1955), Dutch Open (1956, 1958, 1960, 1961, 1962), Scotland's World Invitational Tourney (1957), French Open (1957, 1960), German Open (1958, 1960, 1961), Canadian Open (1962), U.S. Open (1962), along with runner-up finish at the All England Championships (1959)
 PB PBSI's founder (1951) and Komite Olahraga Nasional Indonesia's founder (1966)
 KONI's President (1970)
 Member of staff Asian Games Federation Council (1970)
 Chef de Mission Indonesian contingent to Olympic (1971)
 International Federation Badminton president (1971–1974)
 PBSI's President (1981–1985)

Achievements

Asian Games 

Men's singles

International Open Tournaments (16 titles, 11 runners-up) 

Men's singles

Men's doubles

Mixed doubles

Business career 
 Vayatour Chairman Executive Board Lippo Cikarang
 Ferry Sonneville & Co – owner
 Chairman of Realestat Indonesia Center Council 1986-1989 periods
 President and member of the Executive Committee Realestat Internasional Federation since 1989
 Advisory Council Chairman – International Executive Service

Educational career 
 Pioneer of Trisakti Foundation represent Lembaga Pembinaan Kesatuan Bangsa
 Founder of Himpunan Pembina Perguruan Tinggi Swasta
 Founder of Asosiasi Perguruan Tinggi Katholik Indonesia
 Special Citizen and member of Atma Jaya Foundation
 Member of Fatmawati Foundation
 Member of Bhakti Medika Foundation
 Member of Penyandang Anak Cacat Foundation
 Member of Gedung Arsip Nasional Foundation
 Indonesian Nederland Forum

Honours 
 Satya Lencana Kebudayaan (1961)
 Tanda Jasa Bintang RI Kelas II (1964)
 "Knighthood" from Roman Catholic Church (1972)
 FIABCI Medal of Honour, Melbourne (1988).

References

Sources 
 PBSI, DPP REI, Kompas 21/11/03, Media Indonesia 21/11/03/, Sinar Harapan 20/11/03/, Pikiran Rakyat 21/11/03

External links
Pahlawan Olahraga Indonesia (In Indonesian)

1931 births
2003 deaths
Indonesian male badminton players
Indonesian Roman Catholics
Indo people
Indonesian people of Dutch descent
Erasmus University Rotterdam alumni
Asian Games medalists in badminton
Badminton players at the 1962 Asian Games
People from Batavia, Dutch East Indies
Sportspeople from Jakarta
Asian Games gold medalists for Indonesia
Asian Games bronze medalists for Indonesia
Medalists at the 1962 Asian Games
Badminton executives and administrators